Pope John Paul II High School is a Catholic preparatory school in Hendersonville, Tennessee, United States. It is part of the Roman Catholic Diocese of Nashville.

Notable alumni
 Golden Tate, National Football League (NFL) player
 Josef Newgarden, IndyCar Series driver
 Austin Swift, brother to Taylor Swift

References

Preparatory schools in Tennessee
Private high schools in Tennessee
Private schools in Tennessee
Roman Catholic Diocese of Nashville
Catholic secondary schools in Tennessee
Schools in Sumner County, Tennessee
Educational institutions established in 2002
2002 establishments in Tennessee